Saskatoon can refer to:

Geography

 Saskatoon, the largest city in the Canadian province of Saskatchewan
 Saskatoon (electoral district), a former Canadian federal electoral district
 Saskatoon Metropolitan Area, the area around the city of Saskatoon
 Saskatoon City (disambiguation)

Science and technology
 Amelanchier alnifolia or saskatoon, a shrub and berry native to North America
 Saskatoon experiment, an experiment to measure anisotropies in the cosmic microwave background

Sports
 Saskatoon Blades, a Western Hockey League ice hockey team

Vessels
 , a patrol vessel in the Canadian Forces